Delika is a hamlet located in the municipality of Amurrio, in the province of Álava, in the autonomous community of Basque Country, northern Spain.

See also 
Delika Canyon

External links
 Delika in the Bernardo Estornés Lasa - Auñamendi Encyclopedia (Euskomedia Fundazioa) 

Populated places in Álava